Aid for Trade is an initiative by the World Trade Organization (WTO), as well as a policy concept in international economic and trade development, concerned with helping developing countries and particularly the least developed countries build trade capacity and infrastructure.

Aid for Trade is included in Sustainable Development Goal 8 concerning "decent work and economic growth", which is one of the 17 Sustainable Development Goals which were established by the United Nations General Assembly in 2015. Target 8.a aims to "Increase Aid for Trade support for developing countries, in particular, least developed countries, including through the Enhanced Integrated Framework for Trade-related Technical Assistance to Least Developed Countries."

In 2018, aid for trade commitments remained stable, at $58 billion, based on current prices. South and Central Asia received the highest share thereof (31.4 per cent), followed by sub-Saharan Africa (29.2 per cent). Lower-middle-income countries received 37.5 per cent of aid for trade, followed by least developed countries (36.8 per cent).

Overview

Aid for Trade includes measures to help countries develop trade strategies, plans or projects and implementation, such as building roads, ports, and telecommunications that link domestic and global markets, or investing in industries and sectors to help diversify exports.

Many have credited Aid for Trade with economic improvements in developing countries, while others point out that not all trade initiatives are successful and some of the funding is lost to corruption.

The OECD and WTO established an 'aid-for-trade monitoring framework' to track progress in implementing the Aid-for-Trade Initiative. It consists of the following elements:

 mainstreaming and prioritising trade (demand).
 mainstreaming and prioritising trade (demand)
 trade-related projects and programmes (response).
 enhanced capacity to trade (outcome).
 improved trade performance and reduced poverty (impact).

Value of commitments

According to the UN, in 2017, the global total value of Aid for Trade disbursements exceeded USD 43 billion, with an additional  USD 15 billion committed. Increasing Aid for Trade support is included as an objective in the United Nations Sustainable development growth 8 "decent work and economic growth" indicator 8.a.

The EU and its member states are the largest contributor of Aid for Trade.

In 2018, aid for trade commitments remained stable, at $58 billion, based on current prices. South and Central Asia received the highest share thereof (31.4 per cent), followed by sub-Saharan Africa (29.2 per cent). Lower-middle-income countries received 37.5 per cent of aid for trade, followed by least developed countries (36.8 per cent).

Origins and oversight
The Aid for Trade initiative was launched at the World Trade Organization Ministerial Conference in December 2005, and in 2007, the WTO started implementation of its February 2006 recommendations of the Aid for Trade Task Force as it moved into its first stage.

The purpose of the Global Review is to provide strong monitoring and evaluation for the Aid for Trade agenda. Global Review events have been held under the themes of “Maintaining Momentum”, “Showing Results”, and “Connecting to Value Chains” in 2009, 2011 and 2013 respectively.

First Global Review 2007
Second Global Review 2009
Third Global Review 2011
Fourth Global Review 2013
Fifth Global Review 2015
Sixth Global Review 2017
Seventh Global Review 2019
Eighth Global Review 2022

Sustainable development 
Aid for Trade is included in the Sustainable Development Goal 8 about "decent work and economic growth" which is one of the 17 Sustainable Development Goals which were established by the United Nations General Assembly in 2015. The official wording for Target 8.a is to "Increase Aid for Trade support for developing countries, in particular, least developed countries, including through the Enhanced Integrated Framework for Trade-related Technical Assistance to Least Developed Countries."

This target has one indicator. Indicator 8.a.1 is the "Aid for Trade commitments and disbursements".

The indicator 8.a.1 is measured as total Official Development Assistance (ODA) allocated to aid for trade in 2015 US$.

See also

 Development Assistance Committee
 OECD
Sustainable Development Goals

References

External links
'What is Aid for Trade?' (Australian government briefing paper)

International development
Economic development
Economic growth
Trade
Aid
Sustainable development